The Local Democracy, Economic Development and Construction Act 2009 is an Act of the Parliament of the United Kingdom.

The legislation places a duty on local authorities to promote understanding of the functions and democratic arrangements of the authority among local people. It establishes the framework for the establishment and functioning of the local authority leaders' boards that have been set up in the eight English Regions outside London.

It allows the creation of appointed combined authorities covering multiple local authority areas.

Part 8 of the Act amends Part 2 of the Housing Grants, Construction and Regeneration Act 1996 in relation to “construction contracts”.

Provisions
Part 3 of the Act provides for the establishment of the Local Government Boundary Commission for England (LGBCE), and for the transfer to it of all the boundary-related functions of the Boundary Committee for England of the Electoral Commission. Part 3 also repeals the parts of the Political Parties, Elections and Referendums Act 2000 which could have transferred the functions of each of the UK boundary commissions to the Electoral Commission.

Section 59
The following orders have been made under section 59(1):
The Cornwall (Electoral Changes) Order 2011 (SI 2011/1)
The Northumberland (Electoral Changes) Order 2011 (SI 2011/2)
The Cheshire East (Electoral Changes) Order 2011 (SI 2011/3)
The Cheshire West and Chester (Electoral Changes) Order 2011 (SI 2011/4)
 The Cumbria (Electoral Changes) Order 2012 (SI 2012/3113)

Combined authorities

Sections 103-107 provide for the Secretary of State to establish combined authorities covering the whole of two or more local government areas in England.

Established in 2011
Greater Manchester Combined Authority was the first combined authority to be established.

Established in 2014
Sheffield City Region Combined Authority - Barnsley, Doncaster, Rotherham and Sheffield
Liverpool City Region Combined Authority
North East Combined Authority - Durham, Gateshead, Newcastle upon Tyne, North Tyneside, Northumberland, South Tyneside and Sunderland
West Yorkshire Combined Authority

Part 8
Part 8 relates to construction contracts and in particular:
fees for adjudication (section 141)
payment notices and amounts due for payment (sections 142–145).

References

External links
The Local Democracy, Economic Development and Construction Act 2009, as amended from the National Archives.
The Local Democracy, Economic Development and Construction Act 2009, as originally enacted from the National Archives.
Explanatory notes to the Local Democracy, Economic Development and Construction Act 2009.

United Kingdom Acts of Parliament 2009
Local government legislation in England and Wales